Juan Demóstenes Arosemena is a corregimiento in Arraiján District, Panamá Oeste Province, Panama with a population of 37,044 as of 2010. Its population as of 1990 was 13,418; its population as of 2000 was 24,792.

References

Corregimientos of Panamá Oeste Province